Endacott may refer to:

People with the surname
Frank Endacott, New Zealand rugby player.
George Beer Endacott (1901–1971), British historian.
Paul Endacott (1902–1997), American basketball player.
Shane Endacott, New Zealand rugby player.

Other
Re Endacott, an English trusts law case.